"Forget It" is a song performed by Spanish singer/songwriter Barei. The song was released in Spain as a digital download on 30 June 2017. The song peaked at number 19 on the Spanish Singles Chart.

Background
On 19 June 2017, Barei announced on Twitter that she was bringing out three new songs with different themes. "Forget It" was released in Spain as a digital download on 30 June 2017. It was the second of three song to be released by Barei week-on-week after "Wasn't Me" was released on 23 June 2017, "Worry, Worry" would be released on 7 July 2017.

Lyric video
A lyric video to accompany the release of "Forget It" was first released onto YouTube on 30 June 2017 at a total length of three minutes and forty-five seconds.

Track listing

Charts

Release history

References

2017 songs
2017 singles